John Ivor Disley CBE (20 November 1928 – 8 February 2016) was a Welsh athlete. He competed mainly in the 3000 metres steeplechase before co-founding the London Marathon and becoming active in sports promotion and administration. He was born in Corris, a village in Gwynedd and attended Oswestry Boys High School in Oswestry before studying at Loughborough College.

He competed for Great Britain in the 1952 Summer Olympics held in Helsinki in the 3000 metres steeplechase where he won the bronze medal. He set five British records in the steeplechase and four at two miles. He also set Welsh records at six different distances. He also broke the record for the traverse of the Welsh 3000 foot peaks.

He represented Wales twice at the Commonwealth Games, competing in 1954 and 1958, but did not win a medal either time. Disley's job was teaching PE at Isleworth Grammar School in south-west London.

Disley was one of the founders of the London Marathon, first held in 1981, after running the New York Marathon in 1979 and being very impressed by its success. He was president of the London Marathon Charitable Trust. Disley became vice-chairman of the UK Sports Council in 1974, a post he held until 1982. He was the leading pioneer of orienteering in the UK. He also competed in the 1966 World Orienteering Championships.

Disley was a member of the Welsh Sports Hall of Fame and was President of the Snowdonia Society. He was appointed Commander of the Order of the British Empire (CBE) in the 1979 New Year Honours.

References

External links
John Disley

1928 births
2016 deaths
Sportspeople from Gwynedd
Welsh male long-distance runners
Welsh male steeplechase runners
British male steeplechase runners
Olympic athletes of Great Britain
Olympic bronze medallists for Great Britain
Athletes (track and field) at the 1952 Summer Olympics
Athletes (track and field) at the 1956 Summer Olympics
Welsh Olympic medallists
Commonwealth Games competitors for Wales
Athletes (track and field) at the 1954 British Empire and Commonwealth Games
Athletes (track and field) at the 1958 British Empire and Commonwealth Games
Commanders of the Order of the British Empire
Medalists at the 1952 Summer Olympics
Olympic bronze medalists in athletics (track and field)